The Fluminense Federal University Law School is a teaching unit located at Rua Presidente Pedreira, nº 62, in the neighborhood of Ingá, in Niterói, Rio de Janeiro.

The institution has been highly ranked and is considered to be a traditional school of legal education in Brazil. A centennial institution, its excellent results in bar exams and the efforts of its young researchers put the Fluminense Federal University Law School in a leading position in Brazilian legal research.

Undergraduate Degrees 
Title:

Bachelor of Laws (LLB)

Duration:

10 semesters.

Graduate Degrees 

Titles: Master of Science in Law, Doctor of Science in Law

Graduate Program in law and sociology
Graduate Program in administrative justice
Graduate Program in constitutional law 

Title: Certificate in Law

Certificate program in public administration
Certificate program in private law
Certificate program in civil procedure
Certificate program in public finance and tax law

Law and politics

Brazil government

Executive branch

Brazil Presidents
Ranieri Mazzilli, 25th President of the Brazil

Cabinet of Brazil
Nelson Hungria, Minister Supreme Federal Court and former professor
Oliveira Viana, Minister Federal Court of Accounts
Waldemar Zveiter, Minister Supreme Federal Court
João Augusto de Araújo Castro, Ambassador to the US and United Nations, and Minister of Foreign Affairs
Brígido Fernandes Tinoco, Ministry of Education
Ewald Sizenando Pinheiro, Minister Federal Court of Accounts
Geraldo Montedônio Bezerra de Menezes, Minister and president Superior Labor Court
Celso Barroso Leite, Minister Ministry of Social Security, also served as Officer of the National Social Welfare Department and hired by the ILO - International Labor Organization to structure the Social Security System of Angola in Africa.

Global Leaders

João Havelange, Former President of FIFA

References 

Law schools in Brazil